The Greek language has contributed to the English lexicon in five main ways:
vernacular borrowings, transmitted orally through Vulgar Latin directly into Old English, e.g., 'butter' (from Latin  < ), or through French, e.g., 'ochre';
learned borrowings from classical Greek texts, often via Latin, e.g., 'physics' (< Latin  < );
 a few borrowings transmitted through other languages, notably Arabic scientific and philosophical writing, e.g., 'alchemy' (< );
 direct borrowings from Modern Greek, e.g., 'ouzo';
neologisms (coinages) in post-classical Latin or modern languages using classical Greek roots, e.g., 'telephone' (<  + ) or a mixture of Greek and other roots, e.g., 'television' (< Greek  + English vision < Latin ); these are often shared among the modern European languages, including Modern Greek.

Of these, the neologisms are by far the most numerous.

Indirect and direct borrowings

Since the living Greek and English languages were not in direct contact until modern times, borrowings were necessarily indirect, coming either through Latin (through texts or through French and other vernaculars), or from Ancient Greek texts, not the living spoken language.

Vernacular borrowings

Romance languages

Some Greek words were borrowed into Latin and its descendants, the Romance languages. English often received these words from French. Some have remained very close to the Greek original, e.g., lamp (Latin ; Greek ). In others, the phonetic and orthographic form has changed considerably.

The word olive comes through the Romance from the Latin , which in turn comes from the archaic Greek elaíwā. A later Greek word, boútȳron, becomes Latin  and eventually English butter. A large group of early borrowings, again transmitted first through Latin, then through various vernaculars, comes from Christian vocabulary:

 chair <<  (cf. 'cathedra');
 bishop << epískopos ( 'overseer');
 priest << presbýteros ( 'elder'); and

In some cases, the orthography of these words was later changed to reflect the Greek—and Latin—spelling: e.g., quire was respelled as choir in the 17th century.

Other

Exceptionally, church came into Old English as cirice, circe via a West Germanic language. The Greek form was probably kȳriakḗ [oikía] ( 'lord's [house]').

Learned borrowings

Many more words were borrowed by scholars writing in Medieval and Renaissance Latin. Some words were borrowed in essentially their original meaning, often transmitted through Classical Latin: topic, type, physics, iambic, eta, necromancy, cosmopolite. A few result from scribal errors: encyclopedia <  'the circle of learning' (not a compound in Greek); acne <   (erroneous) <  'high point, acme'. Some kept their Latin form, e.g., podium <  .

Others were borrowed unchanged as technical terms, but with specific, novel meanings: 

 telescope <  'far-seeing', refers to an optical instrument for seeing far away rather than a person who can see far into the distance; 
 phlogiston <  'burnt thing', is a supposed fire-making potential rather than something which has been burned, or can be burned; and
 bacterium <  'stick (diminutive)', is a kind of microorganism rather than a small stick or staff.

Usage in neologisms

But by far the largest Greek contribution to English vocabulary is the huge number of scientific, medical, and technical neologisms that have been coined by compounding Greek roots and affixes to produce novel words which never existed in the Greek language:

 utopia (1516;  'not' +  'place')
 zoology (1669;  + )
 hydrodynamics (1738;  + )
 photography (1834;  + )
 oocyte (1895;  + )
 helicobacter (1989;  + )

So it is really the combining forms of Greek roots and affixes that are borrowed, not the words. Neologisms using these elements are coined in all the European languages, and spread to the others freely—including to Modern Greek, where they are considered to be reborrowings. Traditionally, these coinages were constructed using only Greek morphemes, e.g., metamathematics, but increasingly, Greek, Latin, and other morphemes are combined. These hybrid words were formerly considered to be 'barbarisms', such as:

 television ( + Latin );
 metalinguistic ( + Latin  +  + ); and
 garbology (English garbage + ). 

Some derivations are idiosyncratic, not following Greek compounding patterns, for example: 
 gas (< ) is irregular both in formation and in spelling;
 hadron <  with the suffix -on, itself abstracted from Greek anion; 
 henotheism <  'one' +  'god', though heno- is not used as a prefix in Greek;
Modern Greek uses  in its reborrowing.
 psychedelic <  'psyche' +  'make manifest, reveal'; the regular formation would be ;
 telegram; the regular formation would have been ;
 heuristic, regular formation ;
 chrysalis, regular spelling ;
 ptomaine, regular formation ;
 kerosene, hydrant, symbiont.
 
Many combining forms have specific technical meanings in neologisms, not predictable from the Greek sense:
 -cyte or cyto- <  'container', means biological cells, not arbitrary containers.
 -oma < , a generic morpheme forming deverbal nouns, such as diploma ('a folded thing') and glaucoma ('greyness'), comes to have the very narrow meaning of 'tumor' or 'swelling', on the model of words like carcinoma < . For example, melanoma does not come from  'blackness', but rather from the modern combining forms melano- ('dark' [in biology]) + -oma ('tumor').
 -itis < , a generic adjectival suffix; in medicine used to mean a disease characterized by inflammation: appendicitis, conjunctivitis, ..., and now facetiously generalized to mean "feverish excitement".
 -osis < , originally a state, condition, or process; in medicine, used for a disease.

In standard chemical nomenclature, the numerical prefixes are "only loosely based on the corresponding Greek words", e.g. octaconta- is used for 80 instead of the Greek ogdoeconta- '80'. There are also "mixtures of Greek and Latin roots", e.g., nonaconta-, for 90, is a blend of the Latin nona- for 9 and the Greek  found in words such as ἐνενήκοντα enenekonta '90'. The Greek form is, however, used in the names of polygons in mathematics, though the names of polyhedra are more idiosyncratic.

Many Greek affixes such as anti- and -ic have become productive in English, combining with arbitrary English words: antichoice, Fascistic.

Some words in English have been reanalyzed as a base plus suffix, leading to suffixes based on Greek words, but which are not suffixes in Greek (cf. libfix). Their meaning relates to the full word they were shortened from, not the Greek meaning:
 -ase, used in chemistry for enzymes, is abstracted from diastase, where -ασις is not a morpheme at all in Greek.
 -on for elementary particles, from electron: lepton, neutron, phonon, ...
 -nomics refers specifically to economics: Reaganomics.

Through other languages

Some Greek words were borrowed through Arabic and then Romance. Many are learned: 
 alchemy (al- +  or )
 chemist is a back-formation from alchemist
 elixir (al- + )
 alembic (al- + )

Others are popular: 
 bottarga
 tajine
 carat
 talisman
 possibly quintal ( < Latin ). 

A few words took other routes:
 effendi comes from Turkish, borrowed from Medieval Greek  (/afˈθendis/, 'lord').
 hora (the dance) comes from Romanian and Modern Hebrew, borrowed from  'dance'.

Vernacular or learned doublets

Some Greek words have given rise to etymological doublets, being borrowed both through a later learned, direct route, and earlier through an organic, indirect route:

  adamant, diamond;
  amygdala, almond;
  antiphon, anthem;
  apothec(ary), boutique via French, bodega via Spanish;
  asphodel, daffodil;
  authentic, effendi (αὐθέντης via Turkish);
  (probably itself a borrowing from Semitic) balsam, balm;
  basis, base, bass (voice);
  blasphemy, blame;
  butyr(ic), butter;
  diabol(ic), devil;
  drachma, dram, dirhem via Arabic;
  elaeo-, oil, olive, oleum, latke via Russian and Yiddish;
  eleemosynary, alms;
  episcop(al), bishop;
  zeal, jealous;
  hemicrania, migraine;
  thesaurus, treasure;

  iota, jot;
  cathedra(l), chair, chaise;
 / 'horn' keratin, carat via Arabic;
  'lap, womb, hollow, bay' colp(itis), gulf;
  cybernetics, govern;
  papyrus, paper;
  podium, pew;
  presbyter, priest;
  pyx(is), box;
  scandal, slander;
 / tripod, tripos (both learned);
  'drum' tympanum 'eardrum', timbre, timpani;
  frenetic, frantic;
  chirurgical, surgeon;
  chorus, choir;
  chrism, cream;
  Christian, christen, cretin;
  horo(scope), hour.

Other doublets come from differentiation in the borrowing languages:

  grammatic(al): grammar, glamor, grimoire;
  discus: disc, dish, dais, and desk;
  cither: guitar, zither, gittern, cittern, etc.;

  crypt: grotto, (under)croft;
  parabola: parable; additional doublets in Romance give palaver, parol, and parole;
  phantasy: fantasy; fancy in 15th-century English.

From modern Greek

Finally, with the growth of tourism and emigration, some words reflecting modern Greek culture have been borrowed into English—many of them originally borrowings into Greek themselves: 

 retsina
 ouzo
 souvlaki (< Latin)
 taverna (< Italian)
 moussaka (< Turkish < Arabic)

 baklava (< Turkish)
 feta (< Italian)
 bouzouki (< Turkish)
 gyro (the food, a calque of Turkish döner).

Greek as an intermediary

Many words from the Hebrew Bible were transmitted to the western languages through the Greek of the Septuagint, often without morphological regularization:
 rabbi
 seraphim
 paradise ( < Hebrew < Persian)
 pharaoh ( < Hebrew < Egyptian)

Written form of Greek words in English

Many Greek words, especially those borrowed through the literary tradition, are recognizable as such from their spelling. Latin had standard orthographies for Greek borrowings, including, but not limited to: 

 Greek  was written as 'y'
  as 'e'
  as 'ch'
  as 'ph'
  as 'c'
 rough breathings as 'h'

These conventions, which originally reflected pronunciation, have carried over into English and other languages with historical orthography, like French. They make it possible to recognize words of Greek origin, and give hints as to their pronunciation and inflection.

The romanization of some digraphs is rendered in various ways in English. The diphthongs  and  may be spelled in three different ways in English:

 the Latinate digraphs ae and oe;
 the ligatures æ and œ; and
 the simple letter e.

The ligatures have largely fallen out of use worldwide; the digraphs are uncommon in American usage, but remain common in British usage. The spelling depends mostly on the variety of English, not on the particular word. Examples include: encyclopaedia  / encyclopædia / encyclopedia; haemoglobin / hæmoglobin / hemoglobin; and oedema / œdema / edema. Some words are almost always written with the digraph or ligature: amoeba / amœba, rarely ameba; Oedipus / Œdipus, rarely Edipus; others are almost always written with the single letter: sphære and hæresie were obsolete by 1700; phænomenon by 1800; phænotype and phænol by 1930. The verbal ending  is spelled -ize in American English, and -ise or -ize in British English.

Since the 19th century, a few learned words were introduced using a direct transliteration of Ancient Greek and including the Greek endings, rather than the traditional Latin-based spelling: nous (νοῦς), koine (κοινή), hoi polloi (οἱ πολλοί), kudos (κύδος), moron (μωρόν), kubernetes (κυβερνήτης). For this reason, the Ancient Greek digraph  is rendered differently in different words—as i, following the standard Latin form: idol < εἴδωλον; or as ei, transliterating the Greek directly: eidetic (< εἰδητικός), deixis, seismic. Most plurals of words ending in -is are -es (pronounced [iːz]), using the regular Latin plural rather than the Greek -εις: crises, analyses, bases, with only a few didactic words having English plurals in -eis: poleis, necropoleis, and acropoleis (though acropolises is by far the most common English plural).

Most learned borrowings and coinages follow the Latin system, but there are some irregularities: 

 eureka (cf. heuristic);
 kaleidoscope (the regular spelling would be calidoscope)
 kinetic (cf. cinematography);
 krypton (cf. cryptic);
 stoichiometry (< ; regular spelling would be ).
 aneurysm was formerly often spelled aneurism on the assumption that it uses the usual -ism ending.

Some words whose spelling in French and Middle English did not reflect their Greco-Latin origins were refashioned with etymological spellings in the 16th and 17th centuries: caracter became character and quire became choir.

In some cases, a word's spelling clearly shows its Greek origin:

 If it includes ph pronounced as /f/ or y between consonants, it is very likely Greek, with some exceptions, such as nephew, cipher, triumph.
 If it includes rrh, phth, or chth; or starts with hy-, ps-, pn-, or chr-; or the rarer pt-, ct-, chth-, rh-, x-, sth-, mn-, tm-, gn- or bd-, then it is Greek, with some exceptions: gnat, gnaw, gneiss. 

Other exceptions include: 

 ptarmigan is from a Gaelic word, the p having been added by false etymology;
 style is probably written with a 'y' because the Greek word  'column' (as in peristyle, 'surrounded by columns') and the Latin word stilus, 'stake, pointed instrument', were confused. 

Pronunciation

In clusters such as ps-, pn-, and gn- which are not allowed by English phonotactics, the usual English pronunciation drops the first consonant (e.g., psychology) at the start of a word; compare gnostic [nɒstɪk] and agnostic [ægnɒstɪk]; there are a few exceptions: tmesis [t(ə)miːsɪs].

Initial x- is pronounced z. Ch is pronounced like k rather than as in "church": e.g., character, chaos. The consecutive vowel letters 'ea' are generally pronounced separately rather than forming a single vowel sound when transcribing a Greek εα, which was not a digraph, but simply a sequence of two vowels with hiatus, as in genealogy or pancreas (cf., however, ocean, ωκεανός); zeal (earlier zele) comes irregularly from the η in ζήλος.

Some sound sequences in English are only found in borrowings from Greek, notably initial sequences of two fricatives, as in sphere. Most initial /z/ sounds are found in Greek borrowings.

The stress on borrowings via Latin which keep their Latin form generally follows the traditional English pronunciation of Latin, which depends on the syllable structure in Latin, not in Greek. For example, in Greek, both ὑπόθεσις (hypothesis) and ἐξήγησις (exegesis) are accented on the antepenult, and indeed the penult has a long vowel in exegesis; but because the penult of Latin exegēsis is heavy by Latin rules, the accent falls on the penult in Latin and therefore in English.

Inflectional endings and plurals

Though many English words derived from Greek through the literary route drop the inflectional endings (tripod, zoology, pentagon) or use Latin endings (papyrus, mausoleum), some preserve the Greek endings:

 -ον: phenomenon, criterion, neuron, lexicon;
 -∅: plasma, drama, dilemma, trauma (-ma is derivational, not inflectional);
 -ος: chaos, ethos, asbestos, pathos, cosmos;
 -ς: climax (ξ x = k + s), helix, larynx, eros, pancreas, atlas;
 -η: catastrophe, agape, psyche;
 -ις: analysis, basis, crisis, emphasis; 
 -ης: diabetes, herpes, isosceles.

In cases like scene, zone, fame, though the Greek words ended in -η, the silent English e is not derived from it.

In the case of Greek endings, the plurals sometimes follow the Greek rules: phenomenon, phenomena; tetrahedron, tetrahedra;  crisis, crises; hypothesis, hypotheses; polis, poleis; stigma, stigmata; topos, topoi; cyclops, cyclopes; but often do not: colon, colons not *cola (except for the very rare technical term of rhetoric); pentathlon, pentathlons not *pentathla; demon, demons not *demones; climaxes, not .

Usage is mixed in some cases: schema, schemas or schemata; lexicon, lexicons or lexica; helix, helixes or helices; sphinx, sphinges or sphinxes; clitoris, clitorises or clitorides. And there are misleading cases: pentagon comes from Greek pentagonon, so its plural cannot be ; it is pentagons—the Greek form would be *pentagona (cf. Plurals from Latin and Greek).

Verbs

A few dozen English verbs are derived from the corresponding Greek verbs; examples are baptize, blame and blaspheme, stigmatize, ostracize, and cauterize. In addition, the Greek verbal suffix -ize is productive in Latin, the Romance languages, and English: words like metabolize, though composed of a Greek root and a Greek suffix, are modern compounds. A few of these also existed in Ancient Greek, such as crystallize, characterize, and democratize, but were probably coined independently in modern languages. This is particularly clear in cases like allegorize and synergize, where the Greek verbs ἀλληγορεῖν and συνεργεῖν do not end in -ize at all. Some English verbs with ultimate Greek etymologies, like pause and cycle, were formed as denominal verbs in English, even though there are corresponding Greek verbs, παῦειν/παυσ- and κυκλεῖν.

Borrowings and cognates

Greek and English share many Indo-European cognates. In some cases, the cognates can be confused with borrowings. For example, the English mouse is cognate with Greek  /mys/ and Latin , all from an Indo-European word *mūs; they are not borrowings. Similarly, acre is cognate to Latin  and Greek , but not a borrowing; the prefix agro- is a borrowing from Greek, and the prefix agri- a borrowing from Latin.

Phrases

Many Latin phrases are used verbatim in English texts—et cetera (etc.), ad nauseam, modus operandi (M.O.), ad hoc, in flagrante delicto, mea culpa, and so on—but this is rarer for Greek phrases or expressions: 

 hoi polloi 'the many'
 eureka 'I have found [it]'
 kalos kagathos 'beautiful and virtuous'
 hapax legomenon 'once said'
 kyrie eleison 'Lord, have mercy'

Calques and translations

Greek technical terminology was often calqued in Latin rather than borrowed, and then borrowed from Latin into English. Examples include:

 (grammatical) case, from casus ('an event', something that has fallen'), a semantic calque of Greek πτώσις ('a fall');
 nominative, from nōminātīvus, a translation of Greek ὀνομαστική;
 adverb, a morphological calque of Greek ἐπίρρημα as ad- + verbum;
 magnanimous, from Greek μεγάθυμος (lit. 'great spirit');
 essence, from essentia, which was constructed from the notional present participle *essens, imitating Greek οὐσία.
 Substance, from substantia, a calque of Greek υπόστασις (cf. hypostasis);
 Cicero coined moral on analogy with Greek ηθικός.
 Recant is modeled on παλινῳδεῖν.

Greek phrases were also calqued in Latin, then borrowed or translated into English:

  'god out of the machine' was calqued from the Greek apò mēkhanês theós (ἀπὸ μηχανῆς θεός).
 quintessence is post-classical , from Greek .

Statistics
The contribution of Greek to the English vocabulary can be quantified in two ways, type and token frequencies: type frequency is the proportion of distinct words; token frequency is the proportion of words in actual texts.

Since most words of Greek origin are specialized technical and scientific coinages, the type frequency is considerably higher than the token frequency.  And the type frequency in a large word list will be larger than that in a small word list. In a typical English dictionary of 80,000 words, which corresponds very roughly to the vocabulary of an educated English speaker, about 5% of the words are borrowed from Greek.

Most common

Of the 500 most common words in English, 18 (3.6%) are of Greek origin: place (rank 115), problem (121), school (147), system (180), program (241), idea (252), story (307), base (328), center (335), period (383), history (386), type (390), music (393), political (395), policy (400), paper (426), phone (480), economic (494).

See also

List of Greek and Latin roots in English
List of Greek morphemes used in English
List of Latin and Greek words commonly used in systematic names 
Transliteration of Greek into English
Classical compound
Hybrid word
Latin influence in English

References

Citations

Sources
 Gaidatzi, Theopoula. July 1985. "Greek loanwords in English" (M.A. thesis). University of Leeds
 Konstantinidis, Aristidis. 2006. Η Οικουμενική Διάσταση της Ελληνικής Γλώσσας [The Universal Reach of the Greek Language]. Athens: self-published. .
 Krill, Richard M. 1990. Greek and Latin in English Today. Bolchazy-Carducci Publishers. .
 March, F. A. 1893. "The Influence of the Greeks on the English Language." The Chautauquan 16(6):660–66.
 —— 1893. "Greek in the English of Modern Science." The Chautauquan 17(1):20–23.
 Scheler, Manfred. 1977. Der englische Wortschatz [English vocabulary]. Berlin: Schmidt.
 Oxford English Dictionary (3rd ed.)

External links

Mathematical Words: Origins and Sources (John Aldrich, University of Southampton)

English
Greek